Historiae Ecclesiasticae Tripartitae Epitome, the abridged history (in twelve books) of the early Christian Church known as the Tripartite History,  was the standard manual of Church history in Medieval Europe.

The work, dated to around 550 CE, consists of a compilation of church histories, parts of which were selected by Cassiodorus, and translated into Latin by Epiphanius Scholasticus. It epitomized three Greek works in particular, the church histories of Socrates Scholasticus, Sozomen and Theodoret, written in the previous century. An Italian theory posited its composition around 510 CE, arguing that the work was composed using the library Cassiodorus assembled at the Monasterium Vivariense, the monastery of Vivarium on his family estates at the foot of Mount Moscius on the shores of the Ionian Sea. It is now thought to have been composed several decades later, in Constantinople, around the time the crisis in relations between Justinian and the Western Church, around 550 CE.

It describes a history of the Church from the year 324 to the year 439. 

The book attained a high reputation. Only Eusebius' History, in a Latin translation by Rufinus, competed with it as the official version of church history in the West, until original sources began to be rediscovered, edited and printed by humanist scholars in the 15th century.

Notes

Citations

Sources

 Historia ecclesiastica tripartita: historiae ecclesiasticae ex Socrate CSEL vol. LXXI, Vindobonae 1952.

External links 

 The History of a Historia Utrecht University 2010. 

6th-century history books
6th-century Latin books
Books about ancient Christianity
History of Christianity texts